Nyékonakpoé is a neighborhood of Lomé, Togo.

References

Neighborhoods of Lomé